Micheline Lannoy (born 31 January 1925) is a Belgian pair skater. With partner Pierre Baugniet, she was the 1948 Olympic champion, the 1947 and 1948 World Champion, and the 1947 European champion. Their win at the 1948 Olympics was the first, and up until the 2022 Winter Olympics only, Winter Olympic gold medal for Belgium. She was born in Brussels.

Results
(pairs with Pierre Baugniet)

References

External links
Lannoy and Baugniet at pairsonice.com
Lannoy and Baugniet perform a death spiral at the Olympics

1925 births
Living people
Belgian pair skaters
Figure skaters at the 1948 Winter Olympics
Olympic figure skaters of Belgium
Olympic gold medalists for Belgium
Sportspeople from Brussels
Olympic medalists in figure skating
World Figure Skating Championships medalists
European Figure Skating Championships medalists
Medalists at the 1948 Winter Olympics
20th-century Belgian people